East Kootenay South was an electoral district in the Canadian province of British Columbia in the 1898 and 1900 elections. Its official name was East Kootenay (South Riding). It was created by the partition of the old East Kootenay riding which also created its sibling, East Kootenay (North Riding). Successor ridings in the East Kootenay region were Cranbrook, Fernie, and Columbia.

Election results 
Election winners are in bold.

|-

|- bgcolor="white"
!align="right" colspan=3|Total valid votes
!align="right"|303 
!align="right"|100.00%
!align="right"|
|- bgcolor="white"
!align="right" colspan=3|Total rejected ballots
!align="right"|
!align="right"|
!align="right"|
|- bgcolor="white"
!align="right" colspan=3|Turnout
!align="right"|%
!align="right"|
!align="right"|
|}

|-

|Independent
|William Fernie
|align="right"|383 		 	
|align="right"|39.00%
|align="right"|
|align="right"|unknown

|- bgcolor="white"
!align="right" colspan=3|Total valid votes
!align="right"|982
!align="right"|100.00%
!align="right"|
|- bgcolor="white"
!align="right" colspan=3|Total rejected ballots
!align="right"|
!align="right"|
!align="right"|
|- bgcolor="white"
!align="right" colspan=3|Turnout
!align="right"|55.37%
!align="right"|
!align="right"|
|}

See also
 Kootenay (electoral districts)

References

Electoral History of BC 1871-1986, Elections BC

Former provincial electoral districts of British Columbia
East Kootenay